The Gypsy Solidarity Party (CSZP), was a political party in Hungary for the ethnic Romani minority that existed between 1994 and 2003.

History
The CSZP was founded by members of the Phralipe Independent Gypsy Organization in Budapest on 14 February 1994 to contest the May 1994 parliamentary election. Romani writer and poet Béla Osztojkán, who formerly left the Alliance of Free Democrats (SZDSZ) in 1993, was among the founding members. The CSZP participated in the 1994 national election with four individual candidates, who received 0.08 percent of the votes. After that the party did not contest any further elections.

Election results

National Assembly

References

Sources

Romani political parties
Political parties established in 1994
Political parties disestablished in 2003
1994 establishments in Hungary
2003 disestablishments in Hungary